The following is a comprehensive discography of Scorpions, a German rock band. The band have released 19 studio albums, six live albums, 13 video albums, 29 compilation albums, one cover album, 92 singles and 43 music videos. They have sold between 75 and 100 million records worldwide.

Albums

Studio albums

Live albums

Re-recording albums

Compilation albums

 In France compilation albums are not listed on the Top 200 Albums Chart, but instead on a separate chart for compilation albums only. The French chart positions here for the compilation albums are their peak positions on the French Compilation Albums Chart.

Videos

Music videos

Video albums

Singles

Soundtrack

Covers

References

[ American charts]
German charts

Heavy metal group discographies
Discographies of German artists
Discography